The East Bay Migratory Bird Sanctuary is a migratory bird sanctuary in Kivalliq, Nunavut, Canada. It is located in East Bay, an arm of Hudson Bay, in southeast Southampton Island. The nearest community is Coral Harbour,  to the west.

Established 1 January 1959, and consisting of 113,800 hectares it is rated Category IV by the International Union for Conservation of Nature. Of its 
in overall size,  is a marine area with marine, intertidal, and subtidal components.

Flora
The sanctuary's habitat consists of dry heath, gravel ridge, intertidal zone, moss carpet, scrub willow, and sedge meadow.

Bird species
Notable bird species include:
Arctic tern
Atlantic brant
Black-bellied plover
Black guillemot
Canada goose
Common eider
Golden plover
Herring gull
Jaeger
King eider
Lesser snow goose
Long-tailed duck
Red knot
Red phalarope
Red-throated loon
Ruddy turnstone
Sabines gull
Semipalmated plover
White-rumped sandpiper

Other designations
East Bay/Native Bay is a Canadian Important Bird Area (#NU023) and a Key Migratory Bird Terrestrial Habitat (NU Site 44).

References

East Bay Bird Sanctuary at the Atlas of Canada

Bird sanctuaries of Kivalliq Region
Important Bird Areas of Kivalliq Region
Migratory Bird Sanctuaries of Canada